Not Guilty is a 1908 French short silent film credited to Georges Méliès. It was sold by Méliès's Star Film Company and is numbered 1301–1309 in its catalogues.

An analysis in a Centre national de la cinématographie (CNC) guide to Méliès's films concludes that the film was probably directed not by Méliès but by an employee of his, an actor known as Manuel. The copy reviewed for the CNC guide proved to be edited non-chronologically, with the scenes out of order; this condition suggests that Not Guilty was one of a batch of films Méliès's team produced in a hasty assembly line fashion, and sent to America before it had been edited into shape.

References

External links
 

French black-and-white films
Films directed by Georges Méliès
French silent short films
1900s French films